Love Punjab is a 2016 Punjabi film directed by Rajiv Dhingra, written by Amberdeep Singh and starring Amrinder Gill, Sargun Mehta and Manvir Johal as the main protagonists of the film. This film is about a journey of a family to find love, ties of families and fragrance of Punjab and was released on 11 March 2016.

Plot
Pargat (Amrinder Gill) and Jessica (Sargun Mehta) are a couple who are going through a separation for various reasons. They together have a son named Manveer (Manvir Johal) who has his own set of problems in school, where he faces racism and discrimination issues. Manveer goes into deep depression and on the recommendation of the doctor, his parents decide to take him to Punjab to show his roots, culture and ancestral village. Jessica somehow convinces her father-in-law, Brar Sarpanch (Yograj Singh) to show Manveer that Punjab is better than Canada. Pargat, Jessica, and Manvir go to Punjab together for 15 days. Pargat and Jessica act like a happy couple, as Pargat's parents do not know about their impending divorce. 
After spending time with each other without any interference of work and grind of daily busy life, their love for each other is re-kindled, but they do not tell each other. Manveer is better and enjoying life again. They come back to Canada and get divorced.
After the divorce, Jessica is set to get engaged to Zora, Jessica's childhood friend. Pargat realizes that he loves Jessica and can not live without her. At the engagement, Manvir steals the engagement ring but returns it. Pargat fakes a phone call from his father and Jessica finds out that they still don't know about divorce. Jessica realizes that Pargat was lying and goes outside, citing a network problem. Jessica later leaves her engagement, hops into her car and drives to their home. They have a small argument, and then Pargat confesses his love for her and they patch up. One year later, the couple has a baby girl and they plan to go to Punjab again. The film ends when Parget gets a phone call from his parents and he tells them they are coming to visit.

Cast
 
Sargun Mehta as Jessica Brar
Amrinder Gill  as Pargat Brar
 Yograj Singh as Pargat's father
 Nirmal Rishi as Pargat's mother
 Binnu Dhillon as Naseem (Pargat's neighbour)
 Gurmeet Saajan as scientist 
 Rana Ranbir as school teacher (special appearance)
 Harj Nagra as Zora (Jessica's childhood friend)
 Amberdeep Singh as Pargat's friend (special appearance) 
 Manvir Johal as Manveer/Tuti
 Simran Raien as Naseem's sister 
 Arshi Bains as Jessica's friend
 Harmeet Gill as Jessica's mother
 Harbilas Sangha as Pada
 Hardeep Gill as Pargat's chacha
 Ravinder Kaur as Pargat's chachi
 Mor Cue as Divorce lawyer 
 Bethany Myers as Julia
 Alyssa Andronyk as the voice of Julia

Track list

Trailer controversy
Love Punjab trailer was initially released on 20 February 2016 but in a major controversy this trailer was removed by a fake application to YouTube inc compelling Amrinder Gill to lodge a police complaint. Trailer was again uploaded by producers and was liked by audience.

Box office

Love Punjab had grossed ₹15.5 crore in overseas including ₹6.98 crore in Canada, ₹2.83 crore in United States, ₹1.09 crore in United Kingdom, ₹3.54 crore in Australia and ₹88.38 lacs in New Zealand.

First time in history of Punjabi cinema two major Superstars' films were released on same day, Love Punjab and Ardaas.

Love Punjab shattered the records of Bollywood movies Ranveer Singh's Bajirao Mastani and Akshay Kumar's Airlift in the international market breaking the opening weekend box office collection record with a big margin. While Bajirao Mastani minted  from Australian box office and from New Zealand box office it minted .

Critical response
The Tribune reviewed Love Punjab by giving 3.5 stars out of 5 and added “film take you on a journey to discover your roots and make you proud of them.”

References

External links 
 Love Punjab Official Trailer
 Love Punjab Official Facebook Page
 Love Punjab Jukebox

2016 films
Punjabi-language Indian films
2010s Punjabi-language films
Films scored by Jatinder Shah